Lee Chi Ho (born 16 November 1982 in Hong Kong) is a former Hong Kong professional footballer. His usual position is right back while occasionally playing as a central defender as well.

Club career

South China
He was awarded to be the South China Most Improved Player of the season in 2006/07.

On 25 September 2012, Lee announced his retirement from international football. Soon after the announcement the departure of Head Coach Ernie Merrick, Lee has returned to international football with his fellows in South China.

Beijing Guoan
On 31 May 2013, Lee hinted that he would sign for Chinese Super League side Beijing Guoan in June. On 13 June 2013, he travelled to Beijing to sign an 18-month contract with Beijing Guoan.

South China
Without making a single appearance for Chinese Super League club Beijing Guoan in official matches after joining the club for nearly 4 months, Lee Chi Ho returned to his former club South China on a 3-month loan.

On 4 January 2014, it was announced that Lee re-joined South China on a permanent deal.

Meizhou Hakka
Lee Chi Ho joined China League One club Meizhou Hakka in 2015 after the Second Round of 2018 FIFA World Cup qualification. He had his contract terminated by mutual consent in May 2017 due to pregnancy of his wife.

Happy Valley
On 15 August 2018, Hong Kong First Division club Happy Valley confirmed Lee as one of their signings for the upcoming season.

International career
Lee gained his first cap for Hong Kong in 2000, when Hong Kong beat Singapore by 1–0. Having 70 international caps in total, Lee is currently the second most capped player of the Hong Kong national football team.

Honours

Club
Happy Valley
Hong Kong First Division: 2018–19

International
East Asian Games: 2009

Career statistics

Club
As of 14 June 2013

International
As of 26 December 2017

References

External links
 Lee Chi Ho at HKFA
 

1982 births
Living people
Hong Kong footballers
Association football defenders
Hong Kong First Division League players
Hong Kong Premier League players
Chinese Super League players
China League One players
Yee Hope players
South China AA players
Beijing Guoan F.C. players
Hong Kong Rangers FC players
Meizhou Hakka F.C. players
Eastern Sports Club footballers
Happy Valley AA players
Hong Kong international footballers
Footballers at the 2002 Asian Games
Footballers at the 2010 Asian Games
Hong Kong expatriate footballers
Asian Games competitors for Hong Kong
Hong Kong League XI representative players